The Techtonics are an all-male a cappella group from Imperial College London. The group was formed in 2008, and has since risen to prominence in the world a cappella scene.

The group is best known for winning the International Championship of Collegiate A Cappella in 2016.

The group is also known for winning Best Male Collegiate Song at the Contemporary A Cappella Recording Awards (CARA) for their cover of Earthquake in their 2012 album "Groundbreaker", and for busking weekly on Portobello Road.

History 
Formed in 2008 by Edward Brightman and Christian Carter  the group is composed solely of STEM students from Imperial College London. The Techtonics performed their first gig at 'ArtsFest' (an annual celebration of arts at Imperial) in February 2009. They went on to perform at their first full concert in December 2009 in the Imperial College Christmas concert, which has since become an annual fixture for the group.

In 2010, The Techtonics competed in their first competition, The Voice Festival UK (VFUK), and won the award for outstanding arrangement, awarded to Christian Carter for the arrangement 'Come Undone'. 

In August 2010, the group performed for the first time at the Edinburgh Fringe festival.

In 2015, the International Championship of Collegiate A Cappella (ICCA) began hosting annual live competition rounds in the UK. Imperial College A Cappella Society hosted the semi-finals from 2015 to 2016, which The Techtonics competed in both times. In 2016, the group placed first in the UK, and went on to win the ICCA world championships in New York.

The following summer, the group performed for a second time at the Edinburgh Fringe festival with their show Don’t Push the Button, which was awarded 5 star reviews.

From March - April 2017 the group went on tour to Hong Kong to perform as a part of the Hong Kong International A Cappella Festival.

In April 2017, the group recorded a cover of Bang Bang (Jessie J, Ariana Grande and Nicki Minaj song), arranged by Kyle Alexander Hogan, former member of the University of Rochester YellowJackets, for the UK TV series Tonight at the London Palladium, which aired on 19 April 2017.

Competitions

Voice Festival UK Awards: 
 Outstanding Soloist: Peter Noden, March 2014
 Outstanding Soloist: David Maguire, Outstanding Vocal Percussion: Max Hunter, March 2013
 Outstanding Performance, Outstanding Soloist: David Verhoeven, Feb 2012
 Outstanding Performance, March 2011
 Outstanding Arrangement: Christian Carter for 'Come Undone', Feb 2010 (2nd Year of VFUK)

International Championship of Collegiate A Cappella (ICCA): 
 2016
 World Champions of Collegiate A Cappella 2016
 Outstanding Choreography: UK Quarter Finals (overall performance) and Semi Finals (Bicycle Race by Queen)
 Outstanding Arrangement: Bicycle Race (Arranged by Conrad Godfrey and Alex Moore) UK Quarter Final
 2015
 Competed in 2015 UK Semi-final, did not place.

Tours 

Every year the group embarks on a self-managed tour, normally international, providing the opportunity to perform in many unique venues as well as meet other groups from around the world.

Recordings

Studio albums 
 Groundbreaker (2012)
 CARA winner for Earthquake
 Clockwork (2015)

Live Recordings 
The Techtonics recorded a collaboration with Matt Mulholland, a popular YouTube musician, in 2015, of a cover of Ed Sheeran's Thinking Out Loud.

Many live recordings of The Techtonics busking on Portobello Road are found on Youtube.

Alumni and Current Members

Imperial A Cappella Society 
The Techtonics were ineligible to become a society of the Imperial College Union (ICU) because as a stand-alone group, it is too small in size and single gender. This led to members of the group starting the Imperial College A Cappella Society of which The Techtonics would be part of, with the wider aim of making the activity of A Cappella open to all ICU members and to promote other groups to form.

Societies at Imperial are able to purchase pewter tankards for their society, and get them engraved with leading members - however due to the historical independence of The Techtonics (existing before the a cappella society), both a tankard for The Techtonics and Imperial A Cappella Society reside in the Union bar.

As of 2016, 5 established groups are recorded as being within the society, making it one of the largest university a cappella societies in the UK:
 The Techtonics
 The Imperielles (all-female, formed in 2011)
 The Scopes (mixed, formed in 2011)
 Take Note (all-female, barbershop style)
 Surcery (mixed, fusion style)

The Techtonics perform with the other a cappella groups at Imperial frequently, singing alongside them in Christmas concerts, Easter concerts, and a number of times at the annual Imperial Summer Ball.

References 

Collegiate a cappella groups
Clubs and societies of Imperial College London
Musical groups established in 2008